Globe Life is a financial services holding company listed on the New York Stock Exchange (GL) which operates through its wholly owned subsidiaries providing life insurance, annuity, and supplemental health insurance products. The company is based in McKinney, Texas.

History
The original core of Globe Life, Liberty National Life Insurance Company was founded in 1900 as the Heralds of Liberty, a fraternal benefit society. The company was headquartered in Birmingham, Alabama until 2006 when it moved to McKinney, Texas.

In 1980, Liberty National acquired Globe Life And Accident Insurance Company and formed the holding company, Torchmark Corporation.

In 1981, TMK acquired United Investors Life Insurance Company (UIL), United American Insurance Company, and Waddell and Reed Financial.

In 1994, TMK acquired American Income Life Insurance Company;

In 1998, TMK spun off Waddell and Reed Financial, a mutual fund subsidiary.

In 2006, TMK began moving its headquarters from Birmingham, AL to McKinney, TX.

In 2010, TMK sold United Investors Life Insurance Company (UIL) to Protective Life Corporation.

In 2012, TMK acquired Family Heritage Life Insurance Company of America (FHL). It was renamed Globe Life Family Heritage Division in 2019.

On February 5, 2014, Torchmark's subsidiary Globe Life purchased the naming rights of Globe Life Park in Arlington, formerly Rangers Ballpark in Arlington, the home of Major League Baseball's Texas Rangers Baseball Club located in Arlington, TX. The naming rights were eventually transferred to Globe Life Field, the Rangers' new home park, alongside extending the naming rights through 2048.

In August 2001, a mutual fund company filed a civil racketeering suit against Torchmark Corp., which accused Torchmark Corp. and its former chief executive of scheming to continue control over Waddell & Reed Financial Inc. after Torchmark spun it off in 1998. However, in a series of orders dated February 20, 2003, August 20, 2004, and September 28, 2004, the United States District Court for the Northern District of Kansas later granted summary judgment against plaintiff Waddell & Reed and in favor of Torchmark and the other defendants named in the action.

On August 8, 2019, Torchmark Corporation was renamed to Globe Life and its ticker symbol changed from "TMK" to "GL".

Subsidiaries
Globe Life Liberty National Division, McKinney, Texas
Globe Life And Accident Insurance Company, Oklahoma City, Oklahoma
United American Insurance Company, McKinney, Texas
American Income Life Insurance Company, Waco, Texas
Globe Life Family Heritage Division (previously known as Family Heritage Life Insurance Company of America)

See also  
List of Texas companies (T)

References

External links 

Companies listed on the New York Stock Exchange
Financial services companies established in 1900
Companies based in McKinney, Texas
1900 establishments in Alabama
Life insurance companies of the United States